Minutargyrotoza is a genus of moths belonging to the family Tortricidae.

Species
Minutargyrotoza calvicaput (Walsingham, 1900)
Minutargyrotoza minuta (Walsingham, 1900)

See also
List of Tortricidae genera

References

External links
tortricidae.com

Archipini
Tortricidae genera